Forbregd and Lein are two small adjoining villages in the municipality of Verdal in Trøndelag county, Norway. Statistics Norway classifies the urban area as Forbregd/Lein.

References

Verdal
Villages in Trøndelag